Nathan Peter Haas (born 12 March 1989) is an Australian cyclist. He competed as a professional road racer until the end of 2021. He started competing full time in gravel events 2022.

Career

Early career
Born in Brisbane, Queensland, Australia, Haas was originally a mountain biker, and represented Australia in two UCI World Championships. However, in 2009, Haas switched to road racing.

Praties (2009–2011)
In 2011, after dominating Australia's domestic National Road Series with  teammate Steele Von Hoff, Haas won the Herald Sun Tour. Haas also won the Japan Cup, a race featuring numerous UCI ProTeams.

Garmin–Barracuda (2012–2015)
During Haas' first professional season, he struggled with severe saddle sores. Following Jonathan Tiernan-Locke's doping ban, Haas was retroactively awarded the 2012 Tour of Britain title; he originally finished second to Tiernan-Locke. During the 2013 season, Haas finished sixth overall at the Tour de Langkawi, and competed in his first Grand Tour, the Giro d'Italia. While riding the 2014 Tour Down Under, Haas garnered his first UCI World Tour point, before finishing the race fifth overall.

He was named in the start list for the 2015 Tour de France.

Dimension Data (2016–2017)
In the autumn of 2015  announced that Haas had signed with them for the 2016 season, joining former team-mate Tyler Farrar at the South African outfit.

Team Katusha–Alpecin (2018–2019)
In February 2018, Haas won stage 2 of the Tour of Oman in an uphill sprint finish and moved into the overall leader's jersey. He finished fifth overall in the race, winning the points classification in the process. He also recorded a podium placing at the Tour of Turkey.

Personal life
Haas currently resides in Girona, Catalonia, Spain.

Major results
Sources:

2009
 5th Time trial, National Under-23 Road Championships
2010
 4th Time trial, National Under-23 Road Championships
2011
 1st  Overall Herald Sun Tour
 1st  Overall Tour of Tasmania
 1st Japan Cup
 Oceania Under-23 Road Championships
2nd  Road race
5th Time trial
 2nd Road race, National Under-23 Road Championships
2012
 1st  Overall Tour of Britain
 1st Stage 2 (TTT) Tour of Utah
 10th Japan Cup
2013
 6th Overall Tour de Langkawi
2014
 1st Japan Cup
 4th Overall Herald Sun Tour
1st Stage 1
 5th Overall Tour Down Under
 6th Brabantse Pijl
2015
 3rd Cadel Evans Great Ocean Road Race
 5th Overall Circuit de la Sarthe
 6th Brabantse Pijl
2016
 1st Stage 4 Vuelta a Burgos
 1st  Mountains classification, Tour de Yorkshire
 4th Road race, National Road Championships
 5th Grand Prix Cycliste de Montréal
 6th Grand Prix Cycliste de Québec
 6th Cadel Evans Great Ocean Road Race
2017
 3rd Road race, National Road Championships
 4th Overall Tour Down Under
 4th Amstel Gold Race
 7th Cadel Evans Great Ocean Road Race
 10th Overall Tour of Oman
2018
 3rd Overall Presidential Tour of Turkey
 National Road Championships
5th Road race
5th Time trial
 5th Overall Tour of Oman
1st  Points classification
1st Stage 2
 8th Grand Prix Cycliste de Québec
2019
 4th Time trial, National Road Championships
 9th Rund um Köln
2020
 5th Time trial, National Road Championships
2021
 10th Paris–Camembert
2022
 UCI Gravel World Series
2nd Seven Gravel Race
2nd La Monsterrato

Grand Tour general classification results timeline

References

External links

 

 Cycling Base: Nathan Haas 
 Cycling Quotient: Nathan Haas
  Nathan Haas: Garmin-Sharp

1989 births
Living people
Australian male cyclists
Cyclists at the 2014 Commonwealth Games
Commonwealth Games competitors for Australia
ACT Academy of Sport alumni
Cyclists from Brisbane